Murray Eade is a New Zealand former rugby league footballer who represented New Zealand in the 1972 and 1975 World Cups.

Playing career
Eade played for Ellerslie in the Auckland Rugby League competition and also represented Auckland. In 1971 Eade was part of the Auckland team that defeated Australia 15-14 at Carlaw Park.

Eade was first selected for the New Zealand national rugby league team in 1971 and was then selected to be part of the 1972 World Cup squad. In 1972 Eade won the Rothville Trophy as player of the year in the Auckland competition.

He was made vice captain of Auckland in 1973 and in 1974 was part of their side that defeated Wales 31-5 in 1975. Eade was selected as part of the 1975 World Cup squad and continued to play for the Kiwis until 1978. In total he played in sixteen test matches for New Zealand.

Coaching career
In 1978 Eade was appointed the player-coach of Eastern United, a combined senior team from the Howick and Pakuranga clubs. The team finished the 1979 season undefeated with only three draws. Eade continued as player coach until he was replaced after a poor 1981 season.

References

Living people
New Zealand rugby league coaches
New Zealand rugby league players
New Zealand national rugby league team players
Auckland rugby league team players
Ellerslie Eagles players
Rugby league locks
Year of birth missing (living people)